Swimming at the 2005 Islamic Solidarity Games was held in Swimming Pool of the General Presidency for Youth Welfare, King Abdullah Sport City, Jeddah, Saudi Arabia from April 9 to April 13, 2005.

Medalists

Medal table

References
 Results

Islamic Games
2005 Islamic Solidarity Games
2005